Parliamentary elections were held in Togo on 20 December 2018. They had been initially scheduled for July 2018, but were postponed until ECOWAS called for polling to take place on 20 December. The main opposition parties, which formed Aliance C14, boycotted the elections following the refusal of President Faure Gnassingbé  to fully cancel proposed constitution reforms that would allow him to run for two more terms beyond his current ending term in 2020.

Electoral system
The 91 members of the National Assembly are elected by closed list proportional representation from 30 multi-member constituencies ranging in size from two to ten seats. Seats are allocated using the highest averages method.

Campaign
The elections saw 105 political parties submit lists, alongside 25 lists of independent candidates. A total of 850 candidates ran for the 91 available seats.

Results

References

Togo
2018 in Togo
Elections in Togo
December 2018 events in Africa
Election and referendum articles with incomplete results